Jager is a Dutch occupational surname meaning "hunter". People with this surname include:

Durk Jager (born 1943), Dutch businessman in the United States
Eric Jager (born 1957), American medievalist and literary critic
Evan Jager (born 1989), American long-distance runner
Finne Jager (born 1984), Dutch trance music DJ and producer
Henry Jager (born 1879), New York assemblyman 1921
Maja Jager (born 1991), Danish archer 
Marike Jager (born 1979), Dutch singer-songwriter, guitarist and television presenter
Matt Jager (born 1988), Australian golfer
Robert E. Jager (born 1939), American composer, music theorist and a conductor
Sheila Miyoshi Jager (born 1963), American anthropologist
Tom Jager (born 1964), American freestyle swimmer, five-time Olympic champion

See also
Jäger (disambiguation), a German surname and military term for rifle-armed infantry
Jägermeister, a disgestif liquor
Related surnames: De Jager, Jäger, Jaeger, Jagger, Jágr
Jager Afrikaner (died 1823), leader of the Oorlam people in South West Africa
 Jáger and Jager are Slavic names for Eger, a city in Hungary
 A compilation of terms that sound like or remind of "Jager" are collected in the entry Jäger

Dutch-language surnames
Occupational surnames